Alfred Baxter may refer to:

Alfred Baxter (weightlifter) (1898–1983), British Olympic weightlifter
Alfred Baxter (winemaker) (1928–2005), American winemaker
Alfred Baxter-Cox (1898–1958), Australian military officer and architect